Andronymus caesar, the white dart or common dart, is a butterfly of the family Hesperiidae. It is found in tropical Africa. The habitat consists of forests, moist savannah and riverine bush, from sea level to altitudes of 1,500 metres.

The wingspan is 38–44 mm. Adults are on wing year-round, but mainly from November to April in South Africa.

The larvae feed on Macrolobium, Blighia (including Blighia unijugata), Deinbollia and Phialodiscus species.

Subspecies
Andronymus caesar caesar (Guinea, Sierra Leone, Liberia, Ivory Coast, Ghana, Togo, Nigeria, Cameroon, Gabon, Congo, Central African Republic, Angola, Democratic Republic of the Congo: except east and south)
Andronymus caesar philander (Hopffer, 1855) (Democratic Republic of the Congo: east and south to Shaba, southern Sudan, Uganda, eastern Kenya, Tanzania, Malawi, Zambia, Mozambique, Zimbabwe, South Africa: Limpopo Province to Pafuri, Mpumalanga and the Blyde River Canyon)

References

Butterflies described in 1793
Erionotini